Ayyappa Nayakan Pettai (also called A.N.Pettai) is a village in Ariyalur district, Tamil Nadu, India.

Villages in Ariyalur district